Allodiplophryxus floridanu is an isopoda parasite present in the waters of the Gulf of Mexico.

Description 
Allodiplophryxus floridanus is an Epicaridean isopoda parasite that is found on the gill chamber of Urocaris longicaudata and Periclimenes magnu. The species exhibit sexual dimorphism, the females can grow up to 2.32mm long whereas the males grow to 0.62mm long. It inhabits marine environments.

Distribution 
Allodiplophryxus floridanus is a native species to the Gulf of Mexico. It has been observed along the Florida west coast and the coast of Colombia.

References 

 
Cymothoida